Candace Brooke Weisbrod is an American sportscaster and college basketball analyst and reporter for ESPN.

Early life
Weisbrod was born in Cincinnati, Ohio, where she attended Purcell Marian High School and St. Ursula Academy, and was a three-sport athlete at Coastal Carolina University (basketball, softball, and tennis). She was the second player in school history to amass at least 1,000 points, 300 rebounds and 200 assists. Her basketball awards include Big South Conference Rookie of the Year, Big South Conference Player of the Year, Big South Conference Scholar Athlete of the Year, NCAA Woman of the Year (South Carolina), and the Big South Conference All Decade Team. The Chanticleers played for an NCAA Tournament berth twice, losing to Liberty University in the Big South Conference Championship Game in 1999 and 2000.  Weisbrod lettered in tennis and batted .256 with 4 HR's and 18 RBI's for the 1998 softball team that reached the NCAA Tournament. She graduated magna cum laude and was selected into the Wall School of Business Wall Fellows Program. In 2007, she was inducted into the university’s Athletic Hall of Fame, and in 2013 she was the first female athlete to be named Chanticleer of the Year. Weisbrod briefly played professionally for Germany’s Marburg Marlins until a back injury forced her to retire at 21.

Coastal Carolina statistics
Source

Broadcasting career
Weisbrod began her career in broadcasting with ESPN in 2004 as a women’s college basketball analyst. While building a name for herself in broadcasting, she balanced a sales career in the advertising and metals industries for ten years. Now a full-time sports broadcaster, she covers college, high school, and professional basketball. On January 28, 2009, she called her first men's game, a then Big East matchup with West Virginia defeating St. John’s 75–52 in Morgantown, West Virginia. She is now one of a few female analysts in the country who regularly calls men’s college basketball games. Weisbrod was the analyst for the WNBA’s Chicago Sky for the 2013 and 2014 season, and was named sideline reporter and co-host for MLS’s Chicago Fire in February 2014. On April 7, 2014, she joined WGN-FM’s The Game as news update and on-air personality of the Kap and Haugh Show.

Other ventures 
Weisbrod created Skills and Score in 2017, a non-profit organization providing free sports and arts camps to Chicago Public School students. She also co-founded the Chi-Side, a sports media training program for basketball players ages 11–18. She travels to universities and events across the country as a speaker on the subjects of inspiration and motivation, women in sports, and media training. She has worked with the United Nations Foundation's Girl Up campaign and has also been a guest speaker for Nike, WNBA, and Dick’s Sporting Goods, among others.

Awards and honors 

 1998 Big South Conference Rookie of the Year  
 2001 Big South Conference Player of the Year  
 2001 Big South Conference Scholar Athlete of the Year  
 2001 NCAA Woman of the Year, South Carolina  
 2001 Wall Fellows Program  
 2007 Coastal Carolina University Hall of Fame  
 2013 Chanticleer of the Year  
 2014 Big South Conference All-Decade Team
 2018 Big South Conference Hall of Fame  
 2021 WISE Woman of Inspiration

References

1979 births
Living people
Coastal Carolina Chanticleers softball players
Coastal Carolina Chanticleers women's basketball players
Coastal Carolina Chanticleers women's tennis players
College basketball announcers in the United States
College football announcers
High school basketball announcers in the United States
Lacrosse announcers
Women's college basketball announcers in the United States
Women's National Basketball Association media
Women's National Basketball Association announcers